Eupithecia pannosa is a moth in the family Geometridae. It is found in Pakistan, Nepal and Vietnam.

The wingspan is about 19.5–20 mm. The forewings are dark grey and the hindwings are dirty white in the anterior half and grey in the posterior half along the anal and terminal margins and at the tornus.

References

Moths described in 2008
pannosa
Moths of Asia